Thunbergia fragrans, the whitelady is a  perennial climbing twiner in the genus Thunbergia, native to India and Southern Asia.

Distribution
It is native to India and Southern Asia where it is known as indrapushapa, it is also widespread in the tropics including Florida Hawaii, Australia, New Caledonia, French Polynesia, Caribbean and Indian Ocean islands, southern Africa and Central America

In many places it is considered as an invasive species.

Usage
In Indian Siddha medicine, the paste made out of tender twigs of the indrapushapa is used to combat fever and sometimes applied on cuts and wounds. The Leaves are used as poultice in skin diseases, their juice can be applied on head to cure headache.

References

External links

fragrans
Flora of Asia
Lamiales of Asia